He perdido los zapatos is the debut album by Nena Daconte.

Track listing
 Pierdo el tiempo (2:48)
 Si supieras (4:46)
 Marta (4:24)
 Idiota (2:57)
 No eres mi perro (2:45)
 Loco por mí (2:28)
 En qué estrella estará (2:21)
 Engáñame a mí también (3:22)
 No sé cómo decirte (3:48)
 No paraba de llover (2:28)
 Idiota (Carlos Jean Remix) (3:00)

Re-release bonus tracks
 Pierdo el tiempo (acoustic)
 Engáñame a mí también (acoustic)
 The Mighty Quinn
 DVD

References

2006 debut albums